Presidential elections were held in Portugal on 24 August 1911. Following the Portuguese revolution in 1910 which saw the overthrow of King Manuel II, a Republican Provisional Government was formed under the leadership of Teófilo Braga. This election was held to elect the first official president of the newly established the First Portuguese Republic. Portugal's 1911 constitution stated that the Congress of the Republic must elect the president in Lisbon instead of the Portuguese people.

There were a total of 5 candidates. Manuel de Arriaga was supported by the moderate Republicans (the origins of the Evolutionist and Unionist Party), while Bernardino Machado was supported by the radical republicans (the future Democratic Party) Manuel de Arriaga won against his opponents and he was elected as the first President of the First Portuguese Republic.

Results

References

Portugal
1911 elections in Portugal
Presidential elections in Portugal
August 1911 events